Bolivia Adventist University, or UAB, is a private coeducational Christian university in the city of Cochabamba. The university is affiliated to the Seventh-day Adventist Church and offers degrees in six major fields: Theology, Health Sciences, Nursing, Education, Economic and Administrative Sciences (Business, etc.), and Engineering. UAB is the only Adventist university in Bolivia, but is one of ten such establishments in South America. It is a part of the Seventh-day Adventist education system, the world's second largest Christian school system.

See also

 List of Seventh-day Adventist colleges and universities
 Seventh-day Adventist education
 Seventh-day Adventist Church
 Seventh-day Adventist theology
 History of the Seventh-day Adventist Church
Adventist Colleges and Universities
Christian school

References

External links
Official website (in Spanish)

Buildings and structures in Cochabamba
Universities and colleges affiliated with the Seventh-day Adventist Church
Universities in Bolivia
Nursing schools in Bolivia
Education in Cochabamba Department